Dhank is a wilayah (province) of Ad Dhahirah Governorate in Oman. It borders the provinces of Al Buraimi on the northwest, Ibri on the southwest and Yanqul on the east. It has many valleys, such as Wadi Al Fateh and Wadi Qumeirah.

In 1870, it saw the Battle of Dhank, a key conflict to establishing the Sultanate of Muscat and Oman.

References 

Populated places in Oman
Ad Dhahirah Governorate